Aglaoschema cyaneum is a species of beetle in the family Cerambycidae. It was described by Francis Polkinghorne Pascoe in 1860.

References

Aglaoschema
Beetles described in 1860
Taxa named by Francis Polkinghorne Pascoe